This is a '''list of football clubs in North Korea.

List

April 25 Sports Club (Nampho)
Amrokgang Sports Club
Chandongja Sports Club (Chongjin)

Jadongcha Sports Club
Jebi Sports Club
Kigwancha Sports Club (Sinuiju)
Moranbong Sports Club
Pyongyang City Sports Club
Rimyongsu Sports Club
Ryongnamsan Sports Club
Sobaeksu Sports Club
Sports Union
Wolmido Sports Club
Woonpasan Sports Club
Kyonggongop Sports Club
Hwaebul Sports Club
Haeju Army
South Hamgyong Sports Club 
Rodongja Sports Club

See also

Association football
Football in North Korea
DPR Korea League
North Korea

 
North Korea
Football clubs
Football clubs